Pratidaan;  was a popular Bengali television soap opera that premiered on 21 August 2017 and aired on STAR Jalsha. Produced by Boyhood Productions, it stars Sandipta Sen   and Sheikh Rezwan Rabbani    in lead roles  and Rukma Roy and Debraj Mukherjee in negative roles. It replaced Star Jalsha's  show Milon Tithi. The show will go off air on 23 December 2018 and will get replaced by Bhoomikanya.

Plot
Shimul comes from a village where education has not left its mark yet and being a responsible school teacher herself, Shimul makes it a point to impart education and knowledge to everyone possible in the village. She is progressive in nature and an accomplished educator. As an empowered woman who wants to create her own identity yet stay deeply rooted to her values, Shimul's only motto in life is to enlighten everyone she comes across with proper education. Destiny however, has a poignant role to play in Shimul's life as she gets married into a family where education is of least priority.

Neel is a happening college-goer but hates studies to such an extent that he passed his graduation exams only after appearing for it the 4th time. Neel is also extremely spoilt and is guided by his mother, who herself believes that studies are a waste of time. Neel's mother wants her daughter-in-law to be illiterate as she doesn't want anyone in the family to be more qualified than her son.
Shimul brings changes in Neel for the better, and the two go about life hand-in-hand, overcoming hurdles that life throws at them. Off late, Neel succumbs to a life laced with tragedy and alcohol after the sad demise of Shimul. Sunaina, a con and a bar-crooner makes an entry and is found to be Shimul's exact lookalike.

Cast

Main
Sandipta Sen as Shimul Bosu Sen aka "Shiuli Phool" / Mrs. Braginza or "Beguni Phool"/Sunaina (briefly disguised as)
Rezwan Rabbani Sheikh as Neel Sen / Ronit/Anghsuman/Fake Neel 
Rukma Roy as Madhushree Chowdhury
Tanuka Chatterjee as Shantipriya Sen

Supporting
Saptarshi Chowdhury as Young Neel
Anindya Chakrabarti / Debraj Mukherjee as Ambikesh Nandy
Surojit Bandopadhyay as Ganapati Sen aka Chanachur Buro
Sahana Sen as Mala
Subrata Guha Roy as Neel's Uncle
Ranjini Chatterjee as Madhabi
Rimjhim Mitra as Jaya
Boton as Jaya's Husband
Nabanita Dutta as Pallabi
Priya Malakar as Nisha
Bharat Kaul as Nisha's Father
Chumki Choudhury as Kalyani
Sudip Sarkar as Pranabesh
Sanjoy Bapi Basu as Bhaskar
Purbasha Debnath as Shema

References

2017 Indian television series endings
2018 Indian television series endings
Star Jalsha original programming
Bengali-language television programming in India